Daniele Bazzoffia (born 11 June 1988) is an Italian professional footballer who plays as a forward for ASD Cannara.

Career

Arezzo
Bazzoffia was a player for Perugia until the club was folded. He joined Arezzo. Arezzo relegated from the Serie B in 2007. In August 2007 Bazzoffia, Simone Bernicchi, Matteo Fasciani and Ernesto Terra were signed by Serie B club Grosseto in temporary deals. The club also signed Mirko Barbagli and Angelo Di Nardo outright in August; Walter Bressan in temporary deal in July. In January 2008, Bazzoffia and Bernicchi were moved to Sansovino.

Bazzoffia spent 2008–09 season with the fourth division club Gubbio. In 2009 Bazzoffia returned to Arezzo. The club folded in 2010.

Gubbio
Bazzoffia spent two seasons with Gubbio, winning promotion to Serie B in 2011. He signed a new two-year contract in March 2012. Gubbio relegated back to the third division in 2012.

Parma
On 2 August 2012, Bazzoffia moved to Parma on a permanent deal for undisclosed fee. On 31 August 2012, he moved back to Gubbio on loan, along with Francesco Pambianchi. Excluding Bazzoffia, Parma had paid a total of €1,143,000 to Gubbio in 2012–13 season, for signing Mário Rui (€595,000) as well as performance bonuses for the loan of Alessio Manzoni (€205,000), Pietro Baccolo (€200,000) and Jacopo Galimberti (€143,000) to Gubbio.

On 1 July 2013, Bazzoffia was signed by Slovenian club Gorica along with Bright Addae, Uroš Celcer, Massimo Coda, Alex Cordaz, Sebestyén Ihrig-Farkas, Alen Jogan, Gianluca Lapadula, Floriano Vanzo and Fabio Lebran (Crotone/Parma). The deals were finalized on 3 July.

Olhanense 
On 2 August 2014, Bazzoffia was signed by Portuguese side Olhanense, with Lucas Souza moved to opposite direction.

ASD Cannara
After having played for Prato since September 2017, Bazzoffia joined ASD Cannara ahead of the 2019/20 season.

References

External links
AIC profile (data by www.football.it) 

PrvaLiga profile 

1988 births
Living people
People from Assisi
Italian footballers
Association football forwards
A.C. Perugia Calcio players
S.S. Arezzo players
F.C. Grosseto S.S.D. players
A.C. Sansovino players
A.S. Gubbio 1910 players
Parma Calcio 1913 players
S.C. Olhanense players
Slovenian PrvaLiga players
Serie B players
Serie C players
Italian expatriate footballers
Italian expatriate sportspeople in Portugal
Expatriate footballers in Slovenia
Expatriate footballers in Portugal
Italian expatriate sportspeople in Slovenia
ND Gorica players
Italy youth international footballers
Sportspeople from the Province of Perugia
Footballers from Umbria